Inconfundible is the twenty-fourth studio album by La Mafia.  It was released on October 22, 2001.

Track listing

References

2001 albums
La Mafia albums
Spanish-language albums